Faria Sheikh is a Pakistani actress and model. She is known for her roles in dramas Ishq Na Kariyo Koi, Bharosa Pyar Tera and Mera Dard Na Janay Koi.

Biography and career
In 2014, she began modelling for various companies, designers and magazines. She started to receive offers for dramas, and did her first drama with supporting as Zoya in Rsam. In 2015 she played roles in dramas Akeli and Mera Dard Na Janay Koi. In 2016 she played Seema in Tum Kon Piya and another role in Kitni Girhain Baaki Hain which were a success and she became well known around this time. In 2017 she was already known by the audience, she performed a  lead role in Bharosa with Bilal Qureshi.

Filmography

Television

References

External links
 
 

1996 births
Living people
Pakistani television actresses
21st-century Pakistani actresses